Stadium station may refer to:

Stadium station (Edmonton), a light rail station in Edmonton, Alberta, Canada
Stadium station (MetroLink), a light rail station in St. Louis, Missouri, United States
Stadium station (Sound Transit), a light rail station in Seattle, Washington, United States
Stadium station (San Diego), a light rail station in San Diego, California, United States
Stadium station (UTA), a light rail station in Salt Lake City, Utah, United States
Stadium–Armory station, a rapid transit station in Washington, D.C., United States
Stadium–Chinatown station, a rapid transit station in Vancouver, British Columbia, Canada
Stadium–Ithan Avenue station, a rapid transit station in Radnor Township, Pennsylvania, United States, formerly named Stadium station
Stadium MRT station, a rapid transit station on the Circle line in Singapore
National Stadium BTS station, a rapid transit station in Bangkok, Thailand
Perth Stadium railway station, a suburban railway station in Burswood, Western Australia, Australia
Stadium station (MBTA), a former subway station in Cambridge, Massachusetts, United States

See also
Olympic Stadium station (disambiguation)
Arena station (disambiguation)
Stadion station